The Hongqi S9 is a hybrid sports car produced by Hongqi, which was presented at the 2019 Frankfurt Motor Show.

Presentation

The Hongqi S9 concept was presented on 13 September 2019 at the Frankfurt Motor Show and celebrates 70 years of the People's Republic of China. It foreshadows the plan to launch a hybrid supercar from the Chinese manufacturer limited to 70 copies.

In 2021, the FAW Group announced that it will build the car in the Emilia-Romagna region of Italy as part of a joint venture with Silk EV and hired former Alfa Romeo, SEAT and Audi designer Walter de Silva as Vice President of Styling and Design for a range of Hongqi S vehicles. The production version of the S9 was introduced in 2021 Auto Shanghai.

Technical characteristics

References

S9
Concept cars
Hybrid electric cars
Sports cars
Coupés
Cars introduced in 2019
Rear mid-engine, rear-wheel-drive vehicles